Lillian is a former Indian actress and dancer who primarily worked in Bollywood. She is most famous for her vamp role in the film Apradhi Kaun? (1957).

Early life
Lillian was born in a Jewish family in Bombay. Her father J. S. Ezra was a pharmacist. She had four brothers and a sister, herself being the eldest.

Career
Lillian was discovered by director Bimal Roy on the sets of Yahudi (1956) film. She went their for watching the shooting of the film. Being impressed by her beauty, Roy offered her a role in his next film Apradhi Kaun? (1957). She immediately agreed to his proposal, but her father didn’t approve her. Later on, he changed his mind and Lillian went on to play a vamp's role in that film.

References

Indian female dancers
Indian Jews
Actresses in Hindi cinema
Indian film actresses
Actresses from Delhi
Actresses from Mumbai
Year of birth missing (living people)
Living people